Campyloceras is a genus of Lower Carboniferous (Mississippian) pseudorthocerid that has an elongate, moderately curved, shell.  Curvature is greatest toward the apex and lessens in the adult portion. The siphuncle is central to subcentral with moderately to strongly inflated  segments.  Cameral deposits are well developed on the convex side, toward the apex while only thin on the concave side, making the curvature exogastric.

Campyloceras, named by McCloy in 1844, is related to Pseudactinoceras.  Both are included in the Pseudactinoceratidae.

References

 Walter C. Sweet, 1964. Nautiloidea - Orthocerida. Treatise on Invertebrate Paleontology, Part K. Geological Society of America and University of Kansas Press.
 Bjorn Kroger, 2007. Carboniferous Actinoceroid Nautiloidea (Cephalopoda): a new perspective. Journal of Paleontology, July 2007;

Prehistoric nautiloid genera